The 1918–19 Penn State Nittany Lions basketball team represented Penn State University during the 1918–19 NCAA college men's basketball season. The head coach was Hugo Bezdek, coaching his first season with the Nittany Lions. The team finished with a final record of 11–2.

Schedule

|-

References

Penn State Nittany Lions basketball seasons
Penn State
Penn State Nittany Lions Basketball Team
Penn State Nittany Lions Basketball Team